Escambia High School is a high school located in Escambia County, Florida, United States.

History

Escambia High School opened for the 1958–59 school year, and its first graduating class in 1959 was composed of 207 students. A large number of the first EHS students came from Pensacola High School. It was opened as an all-white segregated school with a school song of Dixie and a Rebel mascot. In 1969 the federal government forced the integration of the school. In 2018, the school censored the yearbook, purging a section on school history to remove all mention of racism in the schools past.

Music program

"The Pride"- Escambia's Marching band has been known throughout the area for its unique shows, currently led by the Director of Bands,Doug Holsworth. The assistant director is Dustin Hicklen. Past Halftime shows include selections from Beethoven (Simply called "Beethoven"), music from the Halo video games, the famous "Take Five" and "Blue Rondo Al A Turk" by The Dave Brubeck Quartet to celebrate Escambia's 50th Anniversary, "Magnum Opus" by the progressive rock band Kansas (along with and interlude of "Carry on, Wayward Son), "Roundabout" based on the song from the band Yes, and a conglomerate of works including the popular "Count Bubba", the unusual "Hunting Wabbits", "Ever Braver, Ever Stronger"-for which, the show is named, "Sing, Sang, Sung", and Mueva Los Huesos (or, "Shake Your Bones") by the modern jazz composer, Gordon Goodwin.

"The Diamonds"- An Indoor Drumline that compete at the regional WGI competitions, and in the World Championships in Dayton, Ohio. The director is Terry Sanders.

They also have a chorus. In the 1960s and 1970s, under the leadership of Choral Director Phyllis Merritt, the Rebelaires (the school's select chorus, later renamed the Escambians) were recognized across the state, the country and the world for their exceptional choral sound and their outstanding performances of serious choral music.

Escambia High School is also known for its orchestra program. Under the direction of Virginia Clark, this strings program consistently produces the top string musicians in the county and state.

Navy JROTC program
Escambia's NJROTC program, which was the first NJROTC unit, ranks among the nation's most prestigious units, with Athletic, Academic, Drill, Color guard, Orienteering, and Air Rifle teams. At the end of the 2010–2011 school year, the Gators had attained another Distinguished Unit Award, the title of Number 1 in Area 8 (Northwest Florida, Alabama, Mississippi, Louisiana, and Arkansas), and well as Number 1 in the nation as of 2013–2014 school year. For the 2011–12 year, the Gators had also attained a Distinguished Unit Award and were once again the Number 1 Unit in Area 8. The unit is currently under the instruction of Commander Christopher Benjamin, Sergeant Major Andre Francis, and Chief Xavier King.

Mascot riots
The Escambia High School riots were racially motivated nonviolent and violent demonstrations which occurred in varying forms between 1972 and 1977 at the then-newly desegregated Escambia High School. The centerpiece riot, which received the most publicity and was the most violent demonstration, occurred on February 5, 1976.

Formerly an all-white school, Escambia High School was forcibly desegregated in 1969. However, the first black student, son of an active duty military officer, had enrolled in 1965 and attended Escambia without any incident whatsoever for approximately one year. He was welcomed into the student body by the school administration, and was assigned an escort to introduce him to the white students. He made friends quickly, was well-received, and attended until his father received orders and transferred. Several years later, in the fall of 1972, black students rioted at a home football game for their team, whose mascot was a "Rebel," modeled in appearance after the Colonel Reb of the University of Mississippi. The school band played the official school song, "Dixie," and it was from there that the violence ensued. Continuing until the end of the 1972–73 academic year, blacks and other students protested the mascot, school song and use of the Confederate Flag, which was flown at school events and games, on the grounds that the imagery the items brought up were insensitive to black people. On July 24, 1973, a United States District Court ruling deemed all of the aforementioned symbols as "racially irritating" and barred their use at the school level (Augustus v. School Board of Escambia County, 361 F. Supp. 383, 1973). At the beginning of the next school year, the name "Raiders" was picked to be the new name for all of Escambia High's athletic teams. Throughout 1974, the Escambia County School District appealed the decision, and on January 25, 1975, the United States Court of Appeals ruled in favor of the school board, overturning the injunction and decreeing that the school board should be in charge of the matter (Augustus v. School Board of Escambia County, 507 F.2d 152, 1975).

The school board victory led to calls for a return of the Rebel nickname, and increased tensions within the school. On February 4, 1976, the school board held an unannounced election in which students were allowed to vote to either keep the name as "Raiders" or change the name back to "Rebels", if 3/4 of the student body approved. The students who preferred "Rebels" failed to secure a supermajority needed to win the ballot, by approximately 30 votes.  However over 300 students had been absent on the day of the vote and they were not allowed to cast ballots.  The next day, a peaceful protest to guarantee a vote to students who had not been allowed to vote the prior day degenerated into a riot which lasted over four hours in the school day. Four students were shot in the violence and twenty-six students were injured by rocks and debris while the calamity involved students smashing windows and trophy cases, as well as fighting with other students. It was estimated that three-quarters of the 2,523 students who attended Escambia High were involved in the riot. In the aftermath, crosses were burned on many school board members' yards, with one member, who was black, specifically targeted with a gunshot which went through his window. A human relations board member as well as a state legislator also had their homes torched. After all the retaliatory violence both at the school and in the community, members from the Florida Highway Patrol and numerous local law enforcement agencies combined to patrol the school until the end of the year.  While waiting for a final determination from the courts and the school board; the student body selected the nickname "Patriots" to be used at school sponsored events during the 1976–77 academic year. In the spring of 1977, after hearing the courts final decision that "Rebels" was not to be reinstated the students chose "Gators" as the permanent nickname. On July 13, 1977, the Ku Klux Klan (KKK) petitioned the Escambia County School Board to hold a meeting at Escambia High School. The Escambia High School Student Body president, John Davis, successfully argued against the petition before the board. The board voted 5–1 against the petition.

Alumni

See also

 Escambia County, Florida
 Pensacola, Florida
 Escambia County School District

References

External links
Official website

Escambia County School District
High schools in Escambia County, Florida
Educational institutions established in 1958
Public high schools in Florida
1958 establishments in Florida